"That's What I Like About You" is a song popularized by Trisha Yearwood in 1991.

That's What I Like About You may also refer to:

 "That's What I Like About You" (Collette song), 1989
 "That's What I Like About You", a song by Al Bowlly, 1931
 "That's What I Like About You", a song by Dale and Grace, 1963
 "That's What I Like About You", a song by John Michael Montgomery from Brand New Me, 2000

See also
 What I Like About You (disambiguation)